The 2000 La Flèche Wallonne was the 64th edition of La Flèche Wallonne cycle race and was held on 12 April 2000. The race started in Charleroi and finished in Huy. The race was won by Francesco Casagrande of the Vini Caldirola team.

General classification

References

2000 in road cycling
2000
2000 in Belgian sport